Magina is a settlement in Kisumu County, Kenya.

References 

Populated places in Central Province (Kenya)